Echinocereus viridiflorus is a species of cactus known by the common names nylon hedgehog cactus, green pitaya, and small-flowered hedgehog cactus. It is native to the central and south-central United States and northern Mexico, where it can be found in varied habitat types, including desert scrub, woodlands, dry grasslands, and short-grass prairie.

This cactus has a small spherical or cylindrical stem 3 centimeters to over 30 centimeters tall and up to 9 centimeters wide. It is mostly unbranched but it may occur in squat clusters of several branches. The body of the plant is ridged and lined with many areoles bearing spines. The spines may be red, yellow, white, purplish, or bicolored, sometimes with darker tips. The flower is up to 3 centimeters long and has tepals in shades of yellowish, brownish, greenish, or occasionally red, with darker reddish midstripes. The tepals are thin at the tips.

Taxonomy
The taxonomy of the species is uncertain, with authors recognizing several varieties which are sometimes treated as separate species. One variety, var. davisii (sometimes called Echinocereus davisii), Davis' green pitaya, is federally listed as an endangered species. This taxon is very small, reaching no more than 3 centimeters tall. It becomes smaller when water is scarce, withdrawing under the ground, sometimes leaving just some spines sticking out. It has yellow-green flowers. This rare variety is endemic to Brewster County, Texas, where it grows in beds of Selaginella in rocky soils of novaculite origin. There was only one population known as of 1984, and it probably will not expand its range because it is limited to a specific mineral substrate.

Subspecies
 Echinocereus viridiflorus subsp. correllii 
 Echinocereus viridiflorus subsp. viridiflorus

References

External links
USDA Plants Profile — Echinocereus viridiflorus
Echinocereus viridiflorus Photo gallery

viridiflorus
Cacti of Mexico
Cacti of the United States
Flora of the Great Plains (North America)
Flora of the Chihuahuan Desert
Flora of the Rio Grande valleys
Flora of Colorado
Flora of New Mexico
Flora of Texas
Flora of Wyoming